St. Patrick's Grammar School may refer to:

St Patrick's Grammar School, Armagh, Armagh, Northern Ireland
St Patrick's Grammar School, Downpatrick, Downpatrick, County Down, Northern Ireland